In Greek mythology, Leanira or Leaneira (Ancient Greek: Λεανείρας), also known as Laodamia, was a Spartan princess who later became an Arcadian queen.

Mythology 
Leanira was the daughter King Amyclas and possibly Diomede, daughter of Lapithes. Through this parentage, she was considered the sister of Argalus, Cynortes, Hyacinthus, Harpalus, Hegesandra, Polyboea, and in other versions, of Daphne.

Later on, Leaneira married King Arcas, son of Callisto and Zeus. The couple had children including Elatus, Apheidas, Azan and Triphylus. The former two sons divided Arcadia after the demise of their father.

Notes

References 

 Apollodorus, The Library with an English Translation by Sir James George Frazer, F.B.A., F.R.S. in 2 Volumes, Cambridge, MA, Harvard University Press; London, William Heinemann Ltd. 1921. ISBN 0-674-99135-4. Online version at the Perseus Digital Library. Greek text available from the same website.
 Fowler, Robert L., Early Greek Mythography. Volume 2: Commentary. Oxford University Press. Great Clarendon Street, Oxford, OX2 6DP, United Kingdom. 2013. 
Parthenius, Love Romances translated by Sir Stephen Gaselee (1882-1943), S. Loeb Classical Library Volume 69. Cambridge, MA. Harvard University Press. 1916.  Online version at the Topos Text Project.
 Parthenius, Erotici Scriptores Graeci, Vol. 1. Rudolf Hercher. in aedibus B. G. Teubneri. Leipzig. 1858. Greek text available at the Perseus Digital Library.
 Pausanias, Description of Greece with an English Translation by W.H.S. Jones, Litt.D., and H.A. Ormerod, M.A., in 4 Volumes. Cambridge, MA, Harvard University Press; London, William Heinemann Ltd. 1918. . Online version at the Perseus Digital Library
 Pausanias, Graeciae Descriptio. 3 vols. Leipzig, Teubner. 1903. Greek text available at the Perseus Digital Library.

Princesses in Greek mythology
Queens in Greek mythology
Laconian characters in Greek mythology
Arcadian mythology
Laconian mythology